Spectrochimica Acta Part A: Molecular and Biomolecular Spectroscopy is a monthly peer-reviewed scientific journal covering spectroscopy.

According to the Journal Citation Reports, the journal has a 2011 impact factor of 2.098. Currently, the editors are Malgorzata Baranska, Joel Bowman, Sylvio Canuto, Christian W. Huck, Judy Kim, Huimin Ma, Siva Umapathy
The journal was established in 1939 as Spectrochimica Acta. In 1967, Spectrochimica Acta was split into two journals, Spectrochimica Acta Part A: Molecular and Biomolecular Spectroscopy and Spectrochimica Acta Part B: Atomic Spectroscopy. Part A obtained its current title in 1995.

References

External links 
 

Spectroscopy
Elsevier academic journals
Publications established in 1939
Chemistry journals
English-language journals
Journals published between 13 and 25 times per year